Gwendolyn Denise Berry (born June 29, 1989) is an American track and field athlete who specializes in the hammer throw. She also holds the world record in the weight throw with a mark of  set in March 2017. She is a three-time national champion in the weight throw at the USA Indoor Track and Field Championships. She was the gold medalist in the hammer at the 2014 Pan American Sports Festival. She is also the 2019 Pan American Games Champion.

Career

Early life and college
Gwen Berry was born to Michael Berry and Laura Hayes; she grew up in Florissant, Missouri and attended McCluer High School. While there she was a basketball player but started taking part in track in the off-season and competed in the triple jump. She began studying for a degree in psychology and criminal justice at Southern Illinois University Carbondale in 2007. She took up throwing events for the Southern Illinois Salukis collegiate team and came fourth in the hammer throw at the 2008 USA Junior Championships.

Her throwing improved the following year and she was the Missouri Valley Conference (MVC) champion in the weight throw and shot put and reached eleventh in the former event at the NCAA Indoor Championships. In 2010, she earned NCAA All-American honours in the weight throw and shot put indoors and the hammer throw outdoors (taking fourth at the 2010 NCAA Outdoors).

Berry's international debut for the United States came at the 2010 NACAC Under-23 Championships in Athletics. She took the hammer bronze, behind Heather Steacy and fellow Salukis athlete Jeneva McCall.

In her last season at Southern Illinois, Berry reached new peaks. A shot put best of  brought her the MVC outdoor title and she later placed twelfth at the 2011 Championships. In the weight throw she  in Bloomington, Indiana, which placed her second in the world for the event that year behind Amber Campbell. She entered as favourite for the weight throw at the NCAA Indoor Championships, but performed poorly, ending in tenth, and commented that she was psychologically affected by being one of the smaller athletes there. Moving to the outdoor season, she threw a personal record to win the hammer at the Drake Relays. Her mark of  ranked her in the world's top 25 athletes for the year. Nerves again affected her at the 2012 NCAA Outdoor Championships, as she failed to reach the final despite being the country's third best thrower that year, behind Jessica Cosby and Amber Campbell.

Professional
After graduation, Berry continued competing with a focus on weight throw in the indoor season and hammer throw in the outdoor season. At the 2011 USA Outdoor Track and Field Championships she ranked sixth. In the 2012 season she came third in the weight throw at the 2012 USA Indoor Track and Field Championships. A new hammer best of  came in April and she entered the 2012 United States Olympic Trials as the number two ranked American woman after Jessica Cosby. Despite the failure, she was approached by New York Athletic Club, who encouraged her to join them and remain in the sport.

Berry secured her first national title at the 2013 USA Indoors, launching the weight throw  to beat out a field including Amber Campbell and Jeneva McCall. She defended her weight throw national title in 2014. The 2014 season marked her first foray into the international professional circuit and she ranked eighth on the 2014 IAAF Hammer Throw Challenge. She was seventh at the 2014 USA Outdoor Track and Field Championships, but was still selected for the Pan American Sports Festival. She enjoyed her highest world ranking that season, placing 17th overall.

Berry skipped the 2015 indoor season and again competed on the circuit, placing tenth in the 2015 IAAF Hammer Throw Challenge final standings (second only to Amanda Bingson among Americans). Berry cleared seventy metres for the first time nationally at the 2015 USA Outdoor Track and Field Championships, but strong performances by Campbell, DeAnna Price and Bingson left her in fifth place overall.

Berry placed second in hammer throw behind Team USA teammates Amber Campbell, ahead of DeAnna Price at 2016 Olympic Trials and represented the United States at 2016 Summer Olympics. She placed 14th.

At the 2020 Olympic Trials, Berry placed third in the hammer throw behind DeAnna Price and Brooke Anderson and represented the United States at the 2020 Summer Olympics, where she qualified for the final and finished 11th.

American record
At the start of 2016, Berry was dominant in the weight throw, winning four straight meetings with throws over 24 meters, including a third career win at the 2016 USA Indoor Track and Field Championships, and ranking number one globally for the season. Her hammer throw was also much improved with consistent throws beyond seventy meters. However, performances from March to June 2016 were annulled due to violation of anti-doping procedues.

Support for U.S. national anthem kneeling protests

During the award ceremony in the 2019 Pan American Games in Lima, Peru. Berry was awarded the gold medal for the hammer throw, she raised her fist at the end of the playing of "The Star-Spangled Banner" in protest against “injustice” in America "and a president who's making it worse." Berry's protests led the U.S. Olympic and Paralympic Committee to issue new guidelines in order to allow peaceful expressions of protest "in support of racial and social justice for all human beings." Berry has stated: "I'm here to represent those who died [due] to this systemic racism."

The International Olympic Committee reprimanded Berry and placed her on probation for 12 months, prohibiting her from any form of protest for a year. Her act cost her sponsorships, and she estimated that she lost $50,000.

In June 2021, during the U.S. Olympic track and field trials for the 2020 Tokyo Olympics, Berry turned away from the U.S. flag during the playing of "The Star-Spangled Banner". She said of the national anthem's timing that "I feel like it was a set-up". According to a spokesperson for USA Track and Field who stated, "The national anthem is played every day according to a previously published schedule", the anthem was scheduled to be played at 5:20 p.m., though on this occasion the music started at 5:25 p.m. Berry claims an official told her the anthem would play prior to her arrival on the podium. Berry has accused critics of her protest of favoring "patriotism over basic morality."

Personal records
Outdoor
Shot put – 16.99 m (2011) Cedar Falls (USA)
Hammer throw – 77.78 m (2018)
Indoor
Shot put – 16.30 m (2010) Charleston (USA)
Weight throw – 25.60m (2017) (WR) Albuquerque (USA)

International competitions

1No mark in the final

National titles
USA Indoor Track and Field Championships
Weight throw: 2013, 2014, 2016
USA Outdoor Track and Field Championships
Hammer throw: 2017

See also 

 Olympic Games 
 United States at the Olympics
 Women's sports
 Performative activism

References

External links 

All-Athletics profile 
Video interview

Living people
1989 births
People from Florissant, Missouri
Sportspeople from St. Louis County, Missouri
Track and field athletes from Missouri
American female hammer throwers
Female weight throwers
Olympic track and field athletes of the United States
Athletes (track and field) at the 2016 Summer Olympics
Pan American Games track and field athletes for the United States
Pan American Games gold medalists for the United States
Pan American Games medalists in athletics (track and field)
Athletes (track and field) at the 2019 Pan American Games
African-American female track and field athletes
Southern Illinois Salukis women's track and field athletes
USA Outdoor Track and Field Championships winners
USA Indoor Track and Field Championships winners
Pan American Games gold medalists in athletics (track and field)
Medalists at the 2019 Pan American Games
Athletes (track and field) at the 2020 Summer Olympics
21st-century African-American sportspeople
21st-century African-American women
20th-century African-American people
20th-century African-American women